Georg Ots (21 March 1920 – 5 September 1975) was an Estonian baritone who besides opera was known as a performer of popular songs. He was on the roster of the Estonian National Opera from 1951 to his death in 1975. He gained wider recognition with the lead role in the 1958, Soviet musical film Mister X, based on Imre Kalman's operetta Die Zirkusprinzessin.

Biography 
Before studying singing with the Estonian baritone Aleksander Rahnel in Yaroslavl in the rear of the Eastern Front, where a cultural centre for evacuated Estonians had been established, Ots was a young Navy Officer who had escaped a sinking ship and was taken prisoner in Russia. He was released a year later, and on his return home, he auditioned for a place at the conservatory in Tallinn. At the same time, he became a member of the chorus at the Estonian National Opera in Tallinn. His solo opera debut was a small part in Eugene Onegin (1944). He soon became one of the most revered singers in Estonia and Finland and was also admired and beloved across Russia.

Ots often performed in many major opera houses of the former Soviet Union, being especially cherished at the Bolshoi Theatre in Moscow. His repertoire included the roles of Eugene Onegin, Yeletzky, Escamillo, Renato, Don Giovanni, Papageno, Rigoletto, Iago, Porgy, Figaro, and the title role in Kabalevsky's Colas Breugnon. Ots sang in Estonian, Russian, Finnish, German, Italian and French, and was fluent in all six languages. Ots's most famous role, which he is often identified with, was the leading character in Anton Rubinstein's opera The Demon. The libretto of The Demon is based on Mikhail Lermontov's famous epic poem, once banned because of its plotline which involves a misalliance between a dark angel and a Georgian princess. Georg Ots' interpretation of the angel mesmerized audiences and received rapturous reviews, making Lermontov's controversial poem even more famous.

The popularity of Ots culminated in 1958 with the release of the Lenfilm Studios musical Soviet film Mister X, based on Imre Kalman's operetta Die Zirkusprinzessin. Ots also played a leading role in Between Three Plagues, a film based on a historical novel by Jaan Kross which illuminates the life of Balthasar Russow, a distinguished Estonian writer and chronicler. Ots loved to perform songs by Mussorgsky and Tchaikovsky, and several other Russian composers, and was also a devoted interpreter of Estonian folk songs. His voice could be heard on radio and TV all over the Soviet Union, and all his records sold out almost immediately.

He also performed successfully in various European countries. After his death in 1975 caused by a brain tumor, the Tallinn Music School was named after him (now Georg Otsa nimeline Tallinna Muusikakool). In 1997, Russian scientists gave his name to a newly discovered minor planet, 3738 Ots (1977 QA1). He was married three times (to Margot Ots (née Laane, since 1950 Heinsoo), Asta Ots (Saar), and Ilona Ots (Noor) respectively) and had two daughters, a son (daughter Ülle Malken (Ots) and son Ülo Ots with Asta Ots, and daughter Mariann Randmaa (Ots) with Ilona Ots), and two adopted sons (Hendrik Ots and Jüri Ots).

Cultural references 
In November 2005, a musical Georg based on the life of Georg Ots was premiered in Tallinn, and on 5 October 2007, Georg, a film based on his life was released.

Legacy
The asteroid "1977 QA1" was named 3738 Ots in his honour in 1996.
The Georg Ots street next to the Estonian National Opera.
Georg Ots Tallinn School of Music, a secondary music school in Tallinn.

References

External links
 
 Георг Отс на сайте Peoples.ru

1920 births
1975 deaths
Male actors from Tallinn
Singers from Tallinn

Soviet male opera singers
Estonian male film actors
Estonian male musical theatre actors
Soviet male film actors
Soviet male stage actors
20th-century Estonian male opera singers
Estonian Academy of Music and Theatre alumni
Tallinn French School alumni
Soviet military personnel of World War II
People's Artists of the USSR
People's Artists of the Estonian Soviet Socialist Republic
Stalin Prize winners
Recipients of the USSR State Prize
Recipients of the Order of Lenin
Recipients of the Order of the Red Banner of Labour
Burials at Metsakalmistu